The Belfast trolleybus system served the city of Belfast, Northern Ireland. It was the only trolleybus system built in Ireland.

The Belfast system was the second largest trolleybus system in the United Kingdom, after the London system. It had a total of 17 routes, and a maximum fleet of 245 trolleybuses.

History
In 1936, Belfast Corporation's tramway committee recommended that an experimental trolleybus service be inaugurated after inspecting the Birmingham, Bournemouth, London, Nottingham, Portsmouth and Wolverhampton systems. Seven pairs of chassis from AEC, Crossley, Daimler, Guy, Karrier, Leyland and Sunbeam were acquired. These were fitted with six types of electric motor with coachwork by five different builders, and were supplied on the proviso that should the trial be a success, Belfast Corporation would purchase them, and should it fail they would be returned.

On 28 March 1938, operations commenced out of Falls Park depot along Falls Road. This was chosen as being a virtually stand-alone route.

Judged a success, Belfast Corporation decided to replace the entire  tramway network. An order was placed with AEC for 114 trolleybuses; however, wartime constraints resulted in only 88 being delivered.

On 13 February 1941 operations began in East Belfast when the Cregagh route commenced from the new Haymarket depot. The network gradually expanded, with the last of the tram network closing in 1954. Further sections were added until 1959 to a total of 37.5 miles. In order to speed up the conversion, eleven second-hand trolleybuses were purchased from Wolverhampton in 1952. In 1958 a prototype Sunbeam was acquired with a view to replacing the earlier vehicles; however, shortly afterwards the first section of the network closed, with the final section closing on 12 May 1968.

Fleet

Trolleybuses were initially painted in a blue and white livery. After World War II this was changed to red and white with silver wheels.

In preservation
Five former Belfast trolleybuses have been preserved:
AEC 664T 98 and Guy BTX 112 at the Ulster Folk & Transport Museum, Cultra
Guy BTX 168 at the Keighley Bus Museum
Guy BTX 183 at the National Transport Museum of Ireland, Dublin
Sunbeam F4A 246 at the East Anglia Transport Museum, Carlton Colville

Depots
Trolleybuses operated from three depots:
Falls Park
Haymarket
Short Strand

See also

History of Belfast
Transport in Belfast
List of trolleybus systems in the United Kingdom

References

Notes

Further reading

External links

National Trolleybus Archive
British Trolleybus Society, based in Reading

History of Belfast
Transport in Belfast
Belfast
Belfast
1938 establishments in Northern Ireland
1968 disestablishments in Northern Ireland